The 1996–97 FIS Cross-Country World Cup  was the 16th official World Cup season in cross-country skiing for men and women. The season began in Kiruna, Sweden, on 23 November 1996 and finished in Holmenkollen, Oslo, Norway, on 15 March 1997. Bjørn Dæhlie of Norway won the overall men's cup, and Yelena Välbe of Russia won the women's. Both skiers won their fifth overall World Cup.

Calendar

Men 

Note: Until FIS Nordic World Ski Championships 1999, World Championship races are part of the World Cup. Hence results from those races are included in the World Cup overall.

Women 

Note: Until FIS Nordic World Ski Championships 1999, World Championship races are part of the World Cup. Hence results from those races are included in the World Cup overall.

Men's team

Women's team

Men's standings

Overall

Long Distance

Sprint

Women's standings

Overall

Long Distance

Sprint

Achievements
Victories in this World Cup (all-time number of victories as of 1996/97 season in parentheses)

Men
 , 7 (37) first places
 , 3 (3) first places
 , 2 (3) first places
 , 1 (29) first place
 , 1 (8) first place
 , 1 (1) first place

Women
 , 7 (44) first places
 , 5 (15) first places
 , 2 (6) first places
 , 1 (1) first place

References

FIS Cross-Country World Cup seasons
World Cup 1996-97
World Cup 1996-97